Oliver Samuels (born 9 November 1948) is a Jamaican comedian and actor. He is often described as the Jamaican "King of Comedy", performing both stand-up and comic theatre.

Career
Samuels found fame on the popular Jamaica Broadcasting Corporation's television series Oliver at Large, created by producer Calvin Butler and playwright Aston Cooke. Nine of the thirteen episodes of the original series, including the pilot episode, Guess Who's Coming to Dinner, were written by prolific Jamaican playwright, Patrick Brown. In this series, Samuels played his alter ego Olivius Adams, aka Oliver. The series featured sketches from Oliver's exploits, often with his sidekick, Maffi—a character created by Patrick Brown. Oliver has subsequently appeared in several Patrick Brown plays, including Large Abroad, Oliver's Posse (1999), Oliver and Pinocchio (2001), and Oliver and the Genie (2002).

Samuels, known by most through Oliver at Large, has combined a career in marketing with life on stage, touring every year between spring and summer before returning home for his executive offices at Mack D's—the Kingston-based company where he is a director and head of marketing and public relations.

Abroad, he is known as Jamaica's Bill Cosby, and is a brand name that is synonymous with Jamaica and laughter. Samuels is widely regarded as one of the funniest talents to emerge from the Caribbean.

In addition to his work with a local car company, Samuels was recently selected by the wire transfer service Unitransfer to star in a series of advertisements that will market their products to Florida's Caribbean community.

Samuels also piloted the launch of "Oliver's Yaad Cyaad", which features Samuels giving instructions in Patois and standard English. The unique feature of Patois prompts is a first for the international calling-card industry.

As well as having a large following in Jamaica and other Caribbean islands, Samuels frequently tours Britain and North America, playing to the Caribbean ex-pat community.

Filmography

Plays
Common Law as Winston 6 November (2009)
Midnight at Puss Creek (2011)

References

External links
 Jamaican Gleaner
 Jamaican Gleaner
 "Jamaicans in the UK Pay Tribute to Oliver Samuels", Jamaica Information Service, 12 November 2005.

Jamaican comedians
Jamaican male television actors
1948 births
Living people
20th-century Jamaican male actors
21st-century Jamaican male actors